Nonanal, also called nonanaldehyde, pelargonaldehyde or Aldehyde C-9, is an aldehyde. A colourless, oily liquid, nonanal is a component of perfumes.  Although it occurs in several natural oils, it is produced commercially by hydroformylation of 1-octene.

Mosquitoes 
Nonanal has been identified as a compound that attracts Culex mosquitoes. Nonanal acts synergistically with carbon dioxide in that regard.

References 

Fatty aldehydes
Alkanals